João Victor Saraiva (born 22 January 1977), better known as Madjer, is a Portuguese retired beach soccer player. He played in the forward position, and has won numerous awards at the FIFA Beach Soccer World Cups for his goalscoring abilities. He took the nickname Madjer because his idol is the former Algerian player Rabah Madjer. He has often been hailed as the best-ever beach soccer player. He became the first player to score 1000 international beach soccer career goals in an 8–1 win against England in September 2016.

In 2019, he was considered, by the prestigious magazine France Football, to be the best beach soccer player of all time.

International career
Madjer has an extraordinary agility and dribbling talent in contrast to his height (194 cm). Besides, he is very capable in acrobatic finishes such as volleys, over-head kicks and bicycle kicks. His skills provide a vital contribution for his team while competing in EBSL, Mundialito, and above all the Beach Soccer World Championship. 

At the 2005, 2006, and 2008 World Cups Madjer won the golden boot for most goals scored in the tournament, and, he also was the MVP of EBSL last season in 1999, 2006, 2008 and 2009.

He retired from the sport after winning the 2019 FIFA Beach Soccer World Cup in a victory over Italy.

Statistics

Honours

Club
Cavalieri del Mare Beach Soccer
Scudetto: 2005
Sporting Clube de Portugal
Circuito Nacional de Futebol de Praia: 2010, 2016
FC Lokomotiv Moscow
Russian National Beach Soccer Championship: 2011;
Euro Winners Cup: 2013
Alanya 
Turkish National Beach Soccer Championship: 2011
Al-Ahli Club
UAE National Beach Soccer Championship: 2012, 2013, 2014
UAE President's Cup: 2014
UAE Supercup: 2014
Beşiktaş J.K.
Turkish National Beach Soccer Championship: 2013

Country
FIFA Beach Soccer World Cup (3): 2001, 2015, 2019
Euro Beach Soccer League (6): 2002, 2007, 2008, 2010, 2015, 2019
Euro Beach Soccer Cup (6): 1998, 2001, 2002, 2003, 2004, 2006
European Games (Gold Medal): 2019
BSWW Mundialito (4): 2003, 2008, 2009, 2012
Copa Latina (1): 2000

Individual
FIFA Beach Soccer World Cup Golden Ball (2): 2005, 2006
FIFA Beach Soccer World Cup Silver Ball (2): 2007, 2009
FIFA Beach Soccer World Cup Bronze Ball (1): 2015
Beach Soccer World Championships Top Scorer (2): 2002, 2004
FIFA Beach Soccer World Cup Golden Shoe (3): 2005, 2006, 2008
FIFA Beach Soccer World Cup Silver Shoe (3): 2009, 2011, 2015
Beach Soccer MVP (3): 2003, 2005, 2006
Beach Soccer Best Player of the Year (2): 2015, 2016
Beach Soccer Goal of the Year (1): 2015
Beach Soccer Team of the Year (2): 2015, 2016
Euro Beach Soccer League MVP (5): 1999, 2006, 2008, 2009, 2010
Euro Beach Soccer League Top Scorer (6): 2001, 2003, 2004, 2006, 2008, 2009
Euro Beach Soccer League Fair Play Award (1): 2005
Euro Beach Soccer League Portuguese Event Top Scorer (1): 2007
Euro Beach Soccer League French Event Top Scorer (1): 2007
Euro Beach Soccer League Spanish Event Top Scorer (1): 2004
Euro Beach Soccer Cup Top Scorer (4): 2004, 2009, 2010, 2012
FIFA Beach Soccer World Cup qualification (UEFA) Top Scorer (1): 2011
Mundialito MVP (6): 2005, 2007, 2008, 2009, 2010, 2012
Mundialito Top Scorer (5): 2004, 2005, 2008, 2010, 2012
Copa Latina MVP (2): 1999, 2000
Capocannoniere Serie A (2): 2008, 2009
Capocannoniere Coppa Italia (1): 2008
Russian National Beach Soccer Championship MVP (1): 2011
Turkish National Beach Soccer Championship MVP (2): 2012, 2013
UAE National Beach Soccer Championship Top Scorer (1): 2012
Mundialito de Clubes Top Scorer (1): 2012

References

External links
Biography
Madjer Blogue
Milano Beach Soccer

1977 births
Living people
Association football forwards
Portuguese footballers
Portuguese beach soccer players
European Games bronze medalists for Portugal
Beach soccer players at the 2015 European Games
European Games medalists in beach soccer
Beach soccer players at the 2019 European Games
European Games gold medalists for Portugal